Kylie Elizabeth Bivens (born October 24, 1978) is an American former professional soccer player who featured as a defender and midfielder and was a member of the United States women's national soccer team. She represented the United States at the 2003 FIFA Women's World Cup.

Early life 
Bivens, a native of Claremont, California, attended Santa Clara University where she featured on the women's soccer team.

Career 
Prior to joining the Women's United Soccer Association, Bivens played for the California Storm. She was selected in the second round of the 2000 WUSA Draft by the Atlanta Beat as the 16th overall selection.

Career statistics

Club
These statistics are incomplete and currently represent a portion of Bivens's career.

References

Further reading 
 "Nothing to Fear" feature on WUSA website

External links 
 
 Player profile at Women's United Soccer Association

American women's soccer players
United States women's international soccer players
Washington Freedom players
1978 births
Living people
Santa Clara University alumni
Atlanta Beat (WUSA) players
Women's association football defenders
Santa Clara Broncos women's soccer players
2003 FIFA Women's World Cup players
Soccer players from California
People from Claremont, California
Sportspeople from Los Angeles County, California
Women's Premier Soccer League players
Women's United Soccer Association players